Capitán Vicente Almandos Almonacid Airport,  is the main airport in La Rioja Province, Argentina serving the city of La Rioja. The airport is on the northeast side of the city.

The airport was named after the Argentine aviation pioneer Vicente Almandos Almonacid (es) (1882–1953).

History

The airport was built in 1948, and was officially inaugurated with an LADE Vickers Viking flight on October 11, 1948 (linking La Rioja with Buenos Aires vía Río Cuarto, San Luis, Santa Rosa, and Córdoba). The first terminal was constructed in 1951. In 1952, Aerolíneas Argentinas started flying to La Rioja.

In 1969, the old north-south grass runway was replaced by the current asphalt Runway 03/21. In 1978, a new  passenger terminal and 70 car parking lot were added. In 1990, the terminal was air conditioned.

The La Rioja VOR and non-directional beacon (Idents: LAR) are located on the field.

Since March 16, 1999, it has been operated by Aeropuertos Argentina 2000.

Airline and destinations

Statistics

See also

Transport in Argentina
List of airports in Argentina

References

External links 
OpenStreetMap - Capitán Vicente A. Almonacid Airport
OurAirports - Capitan V A Almonacid Airport

Airports in La Rioja Province, Argentina